
Stickney is a linear village and civil parish in the East Lindsey district of Lincolnshire, England. It was an ancient parish in Lincoln County. Its population has increased since late 20th-century immigration and is 1127 as of 2011.

Governance
An electoral ward in the same name exists. This ward stretches east to Eastville with a total population taken at the 2011 census of 2,357.

Location and transport
The A16 road runs through it. The village postal address is Boston, although Stickney is not situated within Boston Borough.

The village is on a main bus route between Spilsby and Boston, which runs along the A16. It used to be served by an east–west railway line, but this closed in 1970. A transmitting station is located near Stickney Camp Site to the north.

History

The place-name 'Stickney' is first attested in the Domesday Book of 1086, where it appears as Stichenai. The name means 'stick island', and is thought to refer to the linear shape of the village between two streams. The nearby Stickford similarly means 'stick ford'.

Stickney has been chiefly an agricultural community. The ancient 13th-century Anglican parish church is dedicated to Saint Luke and is a Grade II listed building. The parish dates to 1564 . A new chancel was built in 1853 and the rest of the church was restored in 1855. The tower was partly taken down in 1887 because of deterioration, but rebuilt in 1900.

Donations to the poor house and for care of the poor have been recorded since 1552 when William Hardy left a yearly rent charge of £1 6s. 8d. for the poor of the parish.

Stickney Church of England Primary School serves local children. Some progress to regional grammar schools, and others to the William Lovell Church of England Academy, the former William Lovell Secondary School, on Main Road. Lovell had established a free school in the parish in 1678. After the school was enlarged in 1879, pupils began paying an annual fee of £1 in 1881.

Local amenities have included a public house, the Rose and Crown House on the main road, which operated for about 100 years. As of 2012 it had closed and was for sale. The village had a miniature railway which has now moved locations and a fish and chips shop. A local shop, which does not serve as a post office.

Stickney publishes a monthly Stickney Parish Magazine. The Stickney War Memorial is dedicated to men from the village killed during World War I; their names are listed on the memorial. A photo of the memorial is shown at Genweb.

Notable people
Stickney was the home of Priscilla Biggadike, who in 1868 was charged and convicted of murdering her husband Richard by arsenic poisoning. They lived in a small two-room house with their five children and two lodgers. She testified that she had seen one of their lodgers, Thomas Proctor, putting a white powder into her husband's tea, and later into his medicine when Richard was being treated for a sudden attack of severe illness.

At first, the two were both suspects, as they were rumoured to be having an affair. The judge in the case ruled that only Priscilla Biggadike should be prosecuted, and the jury quickly convicted her. She was executed in December 1868. Years later on his deathbed, Proctor confessed to sole responsibility for the murder of Richard Biggadike.

The French poet Paul Verlaine taught French and drawing for several months in 1875 at William Lovell's School before moving to Boston.

British missionary Mary Jane Lovell was born in Stickney in 1848.

References

External links

 Parish council
 Primary school
 Stickney History; stickneyhistory.co.uk
 William Lovell CE Secondary Modern School

Villages in Lincolnshire
Civil parishes in Lincolnshire
East Lindsey District